Algansee Township is a civil township of Branch County in the U.S. state of Michigan. As of the 2020 census, the township population was 2,033.

There are no incorporated municipalities in the primarily agricultural township. Algansee was first settled in 1836.

Notable people from Algansee Township include Raymond Culver, fourth president of Shimer College in Chicago.

History
It is believed that Luther Stiles and Ludovicus Robbins were the first white permanent settlers in the territory now known as Algansee Township. Although total strangers, by a curious coincidence both moved their families into the township on the same day. The Rev. Robbins led, but became mired in the mud, and Stiles passed him, thus by an hour or so, Mr. Stiles appears to be the original settler.

The township was formed from Quincy Township by the Michigan Legislature on April 2, 1838. The first township meeting and election were held at the house of Horace Purdy early in May 1838. In their petition to the legislature, the settlers suggested the name "Carlton", but the legislature, without explanation, instead selected the name "Algansee". It is thought the name was an invention of Henry Schoolcraft, who had similarly invented the names of many other Michigan counties and townships by blending elements from diverse Native American languages with other languages such as Latin and Arabic. The precise origin and intended meaning is unknown.

Algansee Township assumed its current boundaries on March 25, 1846, when California Township was set off with a separate civil township government.

Geography

Demographics
As of the census of 2000, there were 2,061 people, 746 households, and 561 families residing in the township. The racial makeup of the township was 98.69% White, 0.19% African American, 0.19% Native American, 0.29% from other races, and 0.63% from two or more races. Hispanic or Latino of any race were 0.92% of the population.

There were 746 households, out of which 31.5% had children under the age of 18 living with them, 65.4% were married couples living together, 5.2% had a female householder with no husband present, and 24.7% were non-families. 20.5% of all households were made up of individuals, and 8.6% had someone living alone who was 65 years of age or older. The average household size was 2.71 and the average family size was 3.12.

In the township the population was spread out, with 28.0% under the age of 18, 5.9% from 18 to 24, 26.9% from 25 to 44, 25.9% from 45 to 64, and 13.3% who were 65 years of age or older. The median age was 38 years. For every 100 females, there were 105.9 males. For every 100 females age 18 and over, there were 103.2 males.

The median income for a household in the township was $42,794, and the median income for a family was $44,130. Males had a median income of $30,625 versus $22,051 for females. The per capita income for the township was $18,299. About 4.8% of families and 7.7% of the population were below the poverty line, including 8.4% of those under age 18 and 3.6% of those age 65 or over.

References

External links
Algansee Township official website

Townships in Branch County, Michigan
Populated places established in 1838
Townships in Michigan
1838 establishments in Michigan